The Washington State Library is a government agency that operates public libraries in Washington state's prisons and mental hospitals, and maintains collections related to the state government. Based in Tumwater, it is a service of the Washington Secretary of State and was founded in 1853 as the Washington Territorial Library. The library has a collection of 2.25 million physical items and other online resources available to residents of the state.

History

The Washington Territorial Library was established on March 2, 1853, with the signing of the Organic Act by President Millard Fillmore to create Washington Territory. The law included an appropriation of $5,000 for the territory library that was used by appointed Territorial Governor Issac Stevens to buy and ship 2,130 volumes from New York City to Olympia. The first shipment of books departed from New York City on May 21, 1853, aboard the Invincible, which traveled around Cape Horn and South America to San Francisco. The books were transferred to the Tarquinia and arrived in Olympia on October 23, 1853, a few weeks before Governor Stevens arrived from his overland trip and took office. The library was opened to public use beginning in 1855, after an amendment to the territorial library law was passed by the territorial legislature.

Prior to achieving statehood on November 11, 1889, the Territorial Library reported a collection of 10,448 volumes. The new state legislature passed a bill creating the state library on March 27, 1890. The state library's collection was organized under the Dewey Decimal Classification system in 1898, and a card index was created in 1901. The library occupied the Joel M. Pritchard Building on the State Capitol campus in Olympia from 1958 until it was damaged by the 2001 Nisqually earthquake and evacuated. At its greatest extent in the 1990s, the library contained 547,000 books, periodicals, and documents.

The library was moved to a temporary location in Tumwater in December 2001, while the Pritchard Building underwent already-planned renovations and served as the temporary chambers for the state senate. The general collection was downsized by 260,000 books, which were donated to local libraries. The state government proposed closing the state library as part of its 2002 budget, saving $9 million in annual expenses, but the library was saved by eliminating the state library commission and merging operations with the Office of the Secretary of State effective July 1, 2002. The state government attempted to eliminate the state library a second time in December 2002, with collections transferred to local universities and colleges, but was saved by downsizing its staff and reorganizing under the Office of the Secretary of State. The library has since expanded its digital collections, which include scanned copies of older state newspapers and books.

In 2019, the state legislature approved a $2 fee on recorded documents to fund the construction of a new library and archives building in Tumwater. The $108 million project would construct a joint facility on the South Campus near the former state library. The Washington State Archives are currently housed in a building on the capitol campus that was constructed in 1962 and deemed too small to hold the state's records.

Branches and services

The State Library maintains branches at several state agencies, as well as in correctional facilities and mental hospitals:

Washington State Department of Transportation Library
Washington State Department of Natural Resources Library
Washington State Utilities and Transportation Committee Library
Washington State Department of Labor and Industries Library
WSDOT Materials Laboratory Library
Washington Talking Book & Braille Library, Seattle (since 2008)
Eastern State Hospital Library
Western State Hospital Library
Airway Heights Corrections Center Library
Clallam Bay Corrections Center Library
Coyote Ridge Corrections Center Library
Stafford Creek Corrections Center Library
Twin Rivers Corrections Center Library
Washington Corrections Center Library
Washington Corrections Center for Women Library
Washington State Penitentiary Library
Washington State Reformatory Library

Computer network
The Washington State Library coordinates library access to the Washington K-20 Network.

List of librarians

Bion Freeman Kendall, 1853–1857
Henry R. Crosbie, 1857
Urban East Hicks, 1858
Andrew Jackson Moses, 1859
James Clark Head, 1860–1861, 1863, 1865
Thomas Taylor, 1862
John Paul Judson, 1864
Samuel Nelson Woodruff, 1866
Henry Lensen Chapman, 1866
Levi Shelton, 1867–1869
Jeremiah D. Mabie, 1869–1870
Sylvester Hill Mann, 1870
Champion Bramwell Mann, 1870
Issac Van Dorsey Mossman, 1870–1873
Benjamin Franklin Yantis, 1873–1875
Frederick S. Holmes, 1875–1877
Elwood Evans, 1877–1879
Walter W. Newlin, 1879–1880
James Peyre Ferry, 1880–1881
Eliza Des Saure Newell, 1882–1887
Eleanor Sharp Stevenson, 1888–1890

References

Further reading

External links

Special Collections

1853 establishments in Washington Territory
Government agencies established in 1853
Libraries in Washington (state)
Washington